Moshtaq Ahmadi (born 21 April 1996) is an Afghan footballer who plays as a attacker for .

Career

Ahmadi started his career with Swedish fifth tier side Ljungby. Before the 2018 season, he signed for Räppe GOIF in the Swedish fourth tier. Before the 2019 season, Ahmadi signed for Swedish third tier club Linköping City. In 2021, he signed for Custom in Thailand. Before the 2022 season, he signed for Swedish team .

References

External links

  

1996 births
Afghan expatriate footballers
Afghan expatriate sportspeople in Thailand
Afghan footballers
Afghanistan international footballers
Association football forwards
Moshtaq Ahmadi
Division 2 (Swedish football) players
Division 3 (Swedish football) players
Ettan Fotboll players
Expatriate footballers in Thailand
FC Linköping City players
Living people
Moshtaq Ahmadi